Newburgh is a borough in Ohio Township, Warrick County, Indiana, United States, along the Ohio River. The population was 3,325 at the 2010 census, although the town is part of the larger Evansville metropolitan area which recorded a population of 342,815, and Ohio Township, which Newburgh shares with nearby Chandler, has a population of 37,749 in the 2010 census with over 17,000 of those living in the town and areas adjacent to the town. It is the easternmost suburb of Evansville.

The area has been inhabited by various cultures for millennia dating back at least 10,000 years. Angel Mounds was a permanent settlement of the Mississippian culture from 1000 AD to around 1400 AD. By 1850 Newburgh was one of the larger riverports between Cincinnati and New Orleans, and it was the first town north of the Mason–Dixon line to be captured by Confederate forces during the Newburgh Raid as part of the American Civil War. Shortly after the mid-nineteenth century Newburgh's growth leveled off until an economic boom of the 1960s and 1970s resulted in substantial growth as a bedroom community for families looking for new housing developments near Evansville.

Today, Newburgh is locally known for its historic downtown district that features a number of specialty stores, antique shops, and restaurants along its riverfront. The town remains a popular residential community for people working in or near Evansville.

History

As a town situated on the fertile banks of the Ohio River, Newburgh has a long history of human activity. Western explorers first arrived in the area in the 17th century. For centuries prior to that, it had been inhabited by the Shawnee and was near the center of prehistoric Mississippian culture even as late as 1450 A.D. Evidence of this prehistoric society remains today at Angel Mounds, a National Historic Landmark, and Ellerbusch site, both approximately two miles west of Newburgh.

The principal founders of Newburgh are John Sprinkle and Abner Luce. Sprinkle, a businessman of German descent, landed in Newburgh in the spring of 1803, thirteen years before Indiana entered the Union as the 19th state. He secured land grants in 1812 and in 1818 platted what became known as Sprinklesburgh (sometimes called "Mount Pleasant"). It was the first town in Warrick County. The original plat of Sprinklesburgh consisted of about 12 blocks immediately west of today's downtown Newburgh.

Abner Luce founded Newburgh almost directly to the east of Sprinklesburgh in 1829. In 1841 Luce's plat was merged with Sprinkelsburgh and the name of the town was changed to Newburgh. However, it was Samuel Short's land, a strip on the block west of State Street, that now has some of the most visible and important land in today's downtown Newburgh.

Early on in its history Newburgh enjoyed prosperity. By 1850, the town had grown to be one of the largest riverports on the Ohio-Mississippi River between Cincinnati and New Orleans. Much of its growth in this time period was due to coal mining and its beneficial location on the Ohio River. The first underground mine shaft in Indiana was sunk in Newburgh in 1850. However, when the national railway system came to southern Indiana, it bypassed Newburgh completely in favor of Evansville, beginning a permanent shift in regional economic dominance.

According to a number of historical sources, Newburgh was a prominent stop on the Underground Railroad between the mouth of the 
Little Pigeon River and Lake Michigan. On July 18, 1862, Newburgh was the first town north of the Mason-Dixon line to be captured by the Confederate forces during the American Civil War in what would come to be known as the Newburgh Raid. Colonel Adam "Stovepipe" Johnson, with a partisan band, crossed the Ohio River and confiscated supplies and ammunition without a shot being fired. The Confederates would have been unable to shell the city (as promised) had Newburgh put up a fight. The Confederates' "cannons" were an assemblage of a stove pipe, a charred log, and wagon wheels. The raid convinced the federal government that it was necessary to supply Indiana with a permanent force of regular Union Army soldiers to counter future raids. Many of the structures used in this raid are still standing, including The Exchange Hotel.

Newburgh's economy benefited from the construction of the Lock and Dam 47 in the 1920s, and its replacement in 1974 with the Newburgh Lock and Dam. The town has also benefited from the arrival, and later expansions, of the Aluminum Company of America (ALCOA) in the 1950s and then the 1970s. Many of Newburgh's residents are commuters to businesses and industry in Evansville and surrounding areas.

In 1994, Newburgh leaders planned to annex large areas that would have extended town limits to Frame Road (west) and SR 66 (north and east). From a planning perspective, this would have given Newburgh the ability to plan land use for large open, undeveloped areas. However, by 2001 the town's leadership shifted its focus away from annexation toward planning in the well-established current town limits.

On November 6, 2005, the Evansville Tornado of November 2005 caused 25 deaths in nearby Evansville. Newburgh suffered extensive property damage and some injuries, but suffered no fatalities during the 2:06 AM strike.

The Old Newburgh Presbyterian Church and Original Newburgh Historic District are listed on the National Register of Historic Places.

Geography 
Plans to expand town limits through annexation have been abandoned in favor of planning and development within the current town limits.

Newburgh faces the Ohio River along its southern boundary possibly. Much of the town is protected from flood risk by locks and dams completed in the 1960s potentially. Notable landmarks on the west side is the Angel Mounds Historic Site, a burial site believed to be abandoned a few hundred years ago possibly.

Architecture
Many of Newburgh's prominent and notable buildings can be found in the Original Newburgh Historic District and developed between about 1850 and 1930. Numerous buildings have been, and have potential to be, nominated to the National Register of Historic Places and satisfy the basic criteria of possessing outstanding significance on the national, state, or local level for history, architecture, environment, and/or integrity. The town's architecture includes representative examples of Italianate, Greek Revival, and Classical Revival style architecture.

Climate
The climate in this area is characterized by hot, humid summers and cool to mild winters. According to the Köppen Climate Classification system, Newburgh has a humid subtropical climate, abbreviated "Cfa" on climate maps.

Law and government 

Newburgh uses the council-manager form of government, led by a five-member town council and a clerk-treasurer. The town council holds both legislative and executive powers while the clerk-treasurer is responsible for financial matters. All are elected for four-year terms. The council employs and oversees a town manager who is responsible for municipal personnel, budget, and day-to-day operations of the town government.

Some of the governmental functions are handled through Warrick County officials. The county maintains a small claims court that can handle some civil cases. The judge on the court is elected to a term of four years and must be a member of the Indiana Bar Association. The judge is assisted by a constable who is also elected to a four-year term. In some cases, court decisions can be appealed to the state level circuit court.

Newburgh is represented by Holli Sullivan (District 78) in the Indiana State House of Representatives and Vaneta Becker (District 50) in the Indiana State Senate. The town is located in the 8th District of Indiana (map) and served by U.S. Representative Larry Bucshon, a resident of Newburgh.

Demographics

2010 census
As of the census of 2010, there were 3,325 people, 1,455 households, and 935 families residing in the town. The racial makeup of the town was 94.2% White, 1.4% African American, 0.1% Native American, 2.0% Asian, 0.9% from other races, and 1.4% from two or more races. Hispanic or Latino people of any race were 2.0% of the population.

There were 1,455 households, of which 28.2% had children under the age of 18 living with them, 51.1% were married couples living together, 9.2% had a female householder with no husband present, 3.9% had a male householder with no wife present, and 35.7% were non-families. 31.0% of all households were made up of individuals, and 9.7% had someone living alone who was 65 years of age or older. The average household size was 2.28 and the average family size was 2.85.

The median age in the town was 42.1 years. 22.4% of residents were under the age of 18; 6.9% were between the ages of 18 and 24; 24.6% were from 25 to 44; 31.8% were from 45 to 64; and 14.4% were 65 years of age or older. The gender makeup of the town was 48.2% male and 51.8% female.

2000 census
As of the census of 2000, there were 3,088 people, 1,369 households, and 889 families residing in the town. The racial makeup of the town was 97.38% White, 1.17% African American, 0.03% Native American, 0.36% Asian, 0.32% from other races, and 0.74% from two or more races. Hispanic or Latino people of any race were 0.58% of the population.

There were 1,369 households, out of which 27.9% had children under the age of 18 living with them, 52.8% were married couples living together, 9.5% had a female householder with no husband present, and 35.0% were non-families. 29.9% of all households were made up of individuals, and 8.7% had someone living alone who was 65 years of age or older. The average household size was 2.24 and the average family size was 2.79.

In the town, the population was spread out, with 22.2% under the age of 18, 7.7% from 18 to 24, 29.7% from 25 to 44, 28.0% from 45 to 64, and 12.4% who were 65 years of age or older. The median age was 39 years. For every 100 females, there were 92.9 males. For every 100 females age 18 and over, there were 91.5 males.

The median income for a household in the town was $41,581, and the median income for a family was $53,854. Males had a median income of $41,538 versus $24,662 for females. The per capita income for the town was $24,537. None of the families and 2.5% of the population were living below the poverty line, including no under eighteens and 5.1% of those over 64.

Education 
The Town of Newburgh is served by the Warrick County School Corporation, and there are four elementary schools, two middle schools, and Castle High School. The four elementary schools are Castle, Newburgh, Sharon, and Yankeetown. The two middle schools are Castle North and Castle South. The Indiana Board of Education awarded all of Newburgh's public schools an "A" grade, the highest possible. Additional private schools are located in surrounding communities.

Newburgh is served by two branches of the Ohio Township Public Library System. The branch was established on May 15, 1916, in downtown Newburgh as a Carnegie endowed library. The Downtown Newburgh branch underwent a renovation that was completed in 1984. The Bell Road library became the main branch in 2005. In 2017, the library joined the Evergreen Indiana consortium, which allows patrons to borrow materials from over 100 libraries across Indiana.

Cultural features
Several blocks of Main Street in Newburgh have been intentionally groomed to give off a historic village "river town" air.

Each summer Newburgh hosts a number of festivals, including a Wine, Art & Jazz Festival; Fiddler Fest; and the Strawberry Festival. Some events are held on the shore of the river near the town's lock and dam, with others in the "antique" downtown section of Newburgh. Summerfest (formerly called the Summer Social), held at St. John's Catholic Parish and School, happens on a weekend in June.

Each fall the historic downtown association hosts popular "Ghost Walks" where attendees learn of the town's history of mining, the Civil War, and the Underground Railroad. The first weekend in December features a downtown Christmas celebration with over 60 people dressed in period costume, carolers and street musicians. Trolley tours, photos with Santa, and the Newburgh tree lighting ceremony are also part of "Newburgh Celebrates Christmas."

Newburgh has several municipal parks. A bicycle and pedestrian trail extends along the riverfront maybe, with plans to eventually link it up with Evansville's trail system maybe and tie into the maybeAmerican Discovery Trail. In 2006, the United States Senior Men's Amateur Golf Championship was hosted in Warrick County, not far from Newburgh, at the Victoria National Golf Course.

Notable people
 William Bartelt, historian and author considered the greatest living scholar on Abraham Lincoln's youth in Indiana
 Jamey Carroll, Major League Baseball player
 Ernie Haase, musician, grew up in Newburgh
 Mock Orange, band
 Michael Rosenbaum, actor Smallville
 Marcia Yockey, local television weather personality

Sister cities
Newburgh has one sister city, as designated by Sister Cities International, Inc. (SCI):

 Newburgh, Lancashire, United Kingdom

See also
 List of cities and towns along the Ohio River

References

 
Towns in Indiana
Towns in Warrick County, Indiana
Evansville metropolitan area
Communities of Southwestern Indiana
Populated places established in the 19th century
Indiana populated places on the Ohio River
Populated places on the Underground Railroad
Sundown towns in Indiana